Marcus Thomsen (born 7 January 1998 in Voss) is a Norwegian athlete specialising in the shot put. He won a gold medal at the 2017 European U20 Championships. He also reached the final at the European Indoor Championships finishing seventh.

His family moved from Voss to Aarhus, Denmark in 2012, and Thomsen spent his teenage years there. When breaking through as a youth athlete he did not represent any Norwegian club, eventually being recruited by Oslo-based club IK Tjalve.

His personal bests in the event are 21.03 metres outdoors, achieved in June 2020 at Oslo, and 21.09 metres indoors, achieved in February 2021 at Växjö, Sweden, which is also the national record.

International competitions

References

1998 births
Living people
Norwegian male shot putters
People from Voss
Norwegian expatriates in Denmark
Norwegian Athletics Championships winners
Sportspeople from Vestland